Hugó Lojka (6 January 1845 – 7 September 1887) was a Hungarian teacher and lichenologist. He was one of the first researchers of Hungarian cryptogams, especially lichens.

Life
Lojka was born on 6 January 1845 in Gelsendorf (Sahirne) in Galicia. His father was an evangelical minister from Moravia who had become a naturalized citizen of Hungary, and instilled a love of Hungarian nationality in his children. The young Lojka attended elementary school in Stryi, four classes of middle school in Lviv, and the remainder of his schooling in Eperjes, where the relatives of his father's first wife lived. Lojka attended the University of Vienna during 1862 to 1868. He studied to become a physician, although he spent much of his time in the study of botany. Circumstances prevented him from completing his medical degree, so he went to Budapest. There he obtained a teacher's certificate in mathematics, physics, and chemistry, and went on to become a teacher. He taught first at a junior high school, later at an urban girls' school, and finally at the state girls' high school. In 1886, on his return from an extended journey in Transylvania, he contracted pleurisy, which compelled him to give up teaching. He died on 7 September 1887, at the age of 42.

Lojka collected lichens from all over Hungary from 1862 until his death. His herbarium was purchased by the Vienna National History Museum. Outside of Europe, specimens collected by Lojka are held by Te Papa and the National Herbarium of Victoria, Royal Botanic Gardens Victoria. Loka was also sent specimens from foreign collectors for identification or for circulation in his published exsiccatae (sets of dried herbarium specimens for limited distribution). Examples include lichens collected by New Zealand physician and botanist Charles Knight and by Australian naturalist Richard Helms that were included in Lojka's Lichenotheca Universalis.

Eponymy
Lojka has had many species named in his honour. These include:

Amphisphaeria lojkae ; Biatora lojkana ; Biatorina lojkana ; Caloplaca lojkae ; Gloniopsis lojkae ; Helminthocarpon lojkanum ; Lachnea lojkaeana ; Lecanora lojkae ; Lecanora lojkaeana ; Lecanora lojkahugoi ; Lecidea lojkae ; Lichinella lojkana ;  Parmelia lojkana ; Polyblastia lojkana ; Puccinia lojkaiana ;  Pyrenopeziza lojkae ; Ramalina lojkana ; Ranunculus lojkae ; Sagedia lojkana ; Sordaria lojkaeana ; Sychnogonia lojkana ; Thelidium lojkanum ; Thelopsis lojkana ; and Verrucaria lojkae .

See also
List of Hungarian botanists

References

Cited literature

1845 births
1887 deaths
19th-century Hungarian botanists
Hungarian lichenologists
University of Vienna alumni